Isaiah William Penn Lewis (1808 in Boston, Massachusetts – October 18, 1855 in Boston, Massachusetts) was an American lighthouse designer, builder, and engineer.

He was a nephew of Winslow Lewis, and was often critical of his uncle's work.

I.W.P. Lewis traveled to Europe to study European lighthouse design, and incorporated the lessons he learned into his work. He built a handful of pile lighthouses, most of which were in the Florida Keys.

In 1843 he made a report to Congress on the lighthouses in the country.

References

1808 births
1855 deaths
American designers
19th-century American engineers
Lighthouse builders
Place of birth missing
19th-century American architects
Engineers from Massachusetts
Architects from Boston